Fairy Tail is a Japanese manga series that was written and illustrated by Hiro Mashima; it has been translated into various languages and has spawned a substantial media franchise. The series follows the adventures of the dragon-slayer Natsu Dragneel as he searches for a dragon called Igneel and partners with seventeen-year-old celestial wizard Lucy Heartfilia who joins the titular guild. In Japan, the series has been published by Kodansha in Weekly Shōnen Magazine since August 2, 2006, and in tankōbon format since December 15, 2006. Fairy Tail has 63 volumes and 545 chapters.

The series was originally published in English by Del Rey Manga beginning on March 25, 2008, and ending with the 12th volume in September 2010. Since then, in the United States and Canada, Kodansha USA and Random House have published the English-language adaptation of the series, beginning with the 13th volume in May 2011; they also re-published the earlier 12 volumes under their names. All 63 English volumes have been released.



Volume list

References

External links
Official Kodansha Fairy Tail website 
Official Del Rey Fairy Tail website

Chapter 1